The 12th Pan American Games were held in Mar del Plata, Argentina from March 11 to March 26, 1995.

Medals

Gold

Men's 20 km Road Walk: Jefferson Pérez

Silver

Men's Heavyweight (– 91 kg): Thompson García

Bronze

Men's 5,000 metres: Silvio Guerra

Men's Middleweight (– 76 kg): Walter Llerena (total)
Men's Middleweight (– 76 kg): Walter Llerena (snatch)

See also
 Ecuador at the 1996 Summer Olympics

References
 Ecuadorian Olympic Committee

Nations at the 1995 Pan American Games
P
1995